Gurugram Air Force Station, of the Indian Air Force's Western Air Command,  is located at sector-33 of Gurugram city in Haryana state of India. It is located 28 km south of New Delhi.

History

On 8 October 1932, the Indian Air Force was established in British India as an auxiliary air force of Royal Air Force, and adopted the Royal Air Force uniforms, badges, brevets and insignia. In 1948, first airstrip was built in Haryana when Ambala Air Force Station was established following the independence of India. After the independence of India in 1947, an air force logistics base was established at Faridabad.

The Western Air Command, of which Gurugram Air Force Logistics Station is a key component within the National Capital Region, has been the major operational command involved in most of the war fought by India, including the Indo-Pakistani War of 1947, Sino-Indian War in 1962, the Indo-Pakistani War of 1965, Indo-Pakistan War of 1971, Operation Pawan (1986) in Sri Lanka and Operation Safed Sagar during the 1999 Kargil War, and the ongoing air logistics operations to supply troops deployed at Siachen Glacier.

Facilities

Information Fusion Centre

Indian Information Fusion Centre (IFC) of Indian Navy, collaborates with the Information Fusion Centre - Indian Ocean Region (IFC-IOR), to create the integrated multi-country platform on the vessels of interest in the IOR (Indian Ocean Region) by sharing the nonsensitive information with other IOR friendly partner nations. IFC is based at the Indian Navy's Information Management and Analysis Centre (IMAC) at Gurugram. IMAC is the single point centre on Indian Navy, linking all the coastal radar chains to generate a seamless real-time picture of the nearly 7,500 km coastline. The IFC-IOR can track and monitor 75,000-1.5 lakh shipping traffic in the region in real-time round the clock. India already has shipping information sharing agreement with 21 nations within IOR, of which 12 are already on IFC.

IMAC itself was opened in Gurugram in November 2014 as joint collaboration of Indian Navy, Indian Coast Guard and Bharat Electronics Limited to improve coastal surveillance and to provide coastal security to avert like the 2008 Mumbai terror attacks. It is manned by Navy under National Security Advisor. This fiber optic and satellite-links based network of 20 naval and 31 Coast Guard monitoring stations with 46 existing radars and 30 future planned radars as well as the automatic identification systems fitted on merchant ships, generates a real-time picture 7,500-km long coastline.

Ammunition dump 
The ammunition dump of IAF at sector-33 has restricted area of 300 meter within which no construction is allowed. There are many illegal construction within this restricted zone. Court had ordered these constructions to be removed.

See also

 Ambala Air Force Base
 Sirsa Air Force Station
 Raja Nahar Singh Faridabad Air Force Logistics Station
 Hisar Military Station
 List of Indian Air Force bases
 List of Armed Forces Hospitals In India
 Railway in Haryana
 Road Highways and Expressways in Haryana

References

External links
 Official website of The Indian Air Force
 Indian Air Force on bharat-rakshak.com
 Global Security article on Indo-Pakistani Wars
 Designators Batches of Indian Air Force
 Career Air Force Government of India

Indian Air Force bases